José Tiburcio Serrizuela (born 10 June 1962) is an Argentine former footballer who played as a defender. His nickname is El Tiburón (The Shark).

Career

Early years
Born in Palo, Tucumán Province, Serrizuela started his career with Los Andes in the Argentine 2nd division in 1980. He played for the club until his transfer to Rosario Central in 1985, he then had a spell with Club Atlético Lanús in 1986.

1986-1997

Serrizuela joined Racing de Córdoba of the Primera División Argentina in 1986 and played for the club until he joined River Plate in 1988. He was part of the River squad that won the 1989-1990 championship, and on the back of this success he was selected to play for the Argentina national football team in the 1990 World Cup. Afterwards he moved to Mexico to play for Cruz Azul and Veracruz.

In 1992, Serrizuela returned to Argentina where he played one season for Club Atlético Huracán before joining Club Atlético Independiente where he was part of the squad that won the Clausura 1994 championship. In 1996, he joined Independiente's hated local rivals Racing Club de Avellaneda.

Later years

In 1997, Serrizuela dropped down a division to play for Talleres de Córdoba. He helped them to win the 1997–98 Primera B Nacional title and promotion to the Primera before returning to his boyhood club Los Andes where he played until his retirement in 2000.

Honours

Club
 Rosario Central
Primera B: 1985

 River Plate
Primera División Argentina: 1989–90

 Independiente
Primera División Argentina: 1994 Clausura
Recopa Sudamericana: 1995
Supercopa Libertadores: 1995

 Talleres
Primera B Nacional: 1997–98

References

External links

1962 births
Living people
Argentine footballers
Argentine people of Spanish descent
Sportspeople from Tucumán Province
Club Atlético Los Andes footballers
Club Atlético Independiente footballers
Club Atlético River Plate footballers
Club Atlético Huracán footballers
Talleres de Córdoba footballers
Racing de Córdoba footballers
Club Atlético Lanús footballers
Rosario Central footballers
Cruz Azul footballers
C.D. Veracruz footballers
Racing Club de Avellaneda footballers
Association football defenders
1990 FIFA World Cup players
Argentina international footballers
Argentine Primera División players
Argentine expatriate footballers
Expatriate footballers in Mexico
Argentine expatriate sportspeople in Mexico